The Vietnam Bank for Agriculture and Rural Development or Agribank is the largest commercial bank in Vietnam by total assets.  It is a state-owned corporation under a special status. According to a report by the United Nations Development Programme, Agribank is also the largest corporation in Vietnam.

History
The bank was founded on 26 March 1988, by the then-Council of Ministers of Vietnam as a specialised bank aimed at rural and agricultural development as Vietnam Bank for Agricultural Development. The bank built on the agency network of the State Bank of Vietnam for its branches. On 14 November 1990, it was replaced by the Vietnam Bank for Agriculture by a prime ministerial decision. On 15 November 1996, it was renamed again to Vietnam Bank for Agriculture and Rural Development.

Size
Agribank is the largest bank in Vietnam by most measures: capital, total assets, staff, operating network, and clients. Its capital as of March 2007 was VND 267.000 billion, with an equity of VND 15.000 billion and total assets of almost VND 239.000 billion.  The bank operates 2,225 branches and transaction offices nationwide and employs approximately 40,000 staff.

See also
 List of banks in Vietnam
 AgriBank (disambiguation)

References

External links
  Official website

Banks of Vietnam
Government-owned companies of Vietnam
Banks established in 1988
Vietnamese brands